Two ships of the Polish Navy have been named ORP Sęp:

  was an  launched in 1938 and scrapped in 1972
 , previously the  HNoMS Skolpen acquired in 2002

Polish Navy ship names